North of Nevada is a 1924 American silent Western film directed by Albert S. Rogell and starring Fred Thomson, Hazel Keener, and Josef Swickard.

Plot
As described in a film magazine review, old Mark Ridgeway dies suddenly on his ranch, without having signed a will that provided that his foreman, Tom Taylor, was to inherit the property, which included an irrigation dam. Mark's daughter Marion and her brother Reginald arrive from the east, and they are the new owners of the ranch and dam. Joe Deerfoot, a renegade Indian who wants control of the irrigation dam, uses his gang to trick Marion and Reginald. After many adventures, including fights between Tom and Deerfoot near a cliff and the rescue from drowning of Tom by his steed Silver King, the plotters are defeated by Tom and Marion agrees to become his wife.

Cast

References

Bibliography
 Munden, Kenneth White. The American Film Institute Catalog of Motion Pictures Produced in the United States, Part 1. University of California Press, 1997.

External links
 

1924 films
1924 Western (genre) films
Films directed by Albert S. Rogell
1920s English-language films
Film Booking Offices of America films
American black-and-white films
Silent American Western (genre) films
1920s American films